Ambrosio Solorzano (born 7 December 1937) is a Venezuelan weightlifter. He competed in the men's middleweight event at the 1960 Summer Olympics.

References

External links
 

1937 births
Living people
Venezuelan male weightlifters
Olympic weightlifters of Venezuela
Weightlifters at the 1960 Summer Olympics
Sportspeople from Caracas
20th-century Venezuelan people
21st-century Venezuelan people